Greg is a masculine given name, and often a shortened form of the given name Gregory. Greg (more commonly spelled "Gregg") is also a surname.

People with the name
Greg Abbott (disambiguation), multiple people
Greg Abel (born 1961/1962), Canadian businessman
Greg Adams (disambiguation), multiple people
Greg Allen (disambiguation), multiple people
Greg Anderson (disambiguation), multiple people
Greg Austin (disambiguation), multiple people
Greg Ball (disambiguation), multiple people
Greg Bell (disambiguation), multiple people
Greg Bennett (disambiguation), multiple people
Greg Berlanti (born 1972), American writer and producer
Greg Biffle (born 1969), American NASCAR driver
Greg Blankenship (born 1954), American football player
Greg Boyd (disambiguation), multiple people
Greg Boyer (disambiguation), multiple people
Greg Brady (broadcaster) (born 1971), Canadian sports radio host
Greg Brock (baseball) (born 1957), American baseball player
Greg Brooker (disambiguation), multiple people
Greg Brooks (disambiguation), multiple people
Greg Brown (disambiguation), multiple people
Greg Bryant (disambiguation), multiple people
Greg Burke (disambiguation), multiple people
Greg Burns (disambiguation), multiple people
Greg Camarillo (born 1982), American football player
Greg Campbell (disambiguation), multiple people
Greg Carey (disambiguation), multiple people
Greg Alyn Carlson (1971–2019), American fugitive
Greg Carr (disambiguation), multiple people
Greg Carter (disambiguation), multiple people
Greg Clark (disambiguation), multiple people
Greg Collins (disambiguation), multiple people
Greg Cook (disambiguation), multiple people
Greg Cox (disambiguation), multiple people
Greg Craven (disambiguation), multiple people
Greg Davies (born 1968), Welsh comedian and actor
Greg Davis (disambiguation), multiple people
Greg Dean (disambiguation), multiple people
Greg Dobbs (born 1978), American baseball player
Greg Dortch (born 1998), American football player
Greg Downs (born 1958), English footballer
Greg Downs (writer) (born 1971), American author and historian
Greg Ducre, American football player
Greg Dulli (born 1965), American musician, founding member of The Afghan Whigs, The Twilight Singers, and The Gutter Twins
Greg Eagles (born 1970), African-American actor
Greg Edwards (disambiguation), multiple people
Greg Ellis (disambiguation), multiple people
Greg Evans (disambiguation), multiple people
Greg Fidelman (born 1977), American music engineer, producer and mixer
Greg Foster (disambiguation), multiple people
Greg Fox (disambiguation), multiple people
Greg Gagne (disambiguation), multiple people
Greg Gaines (disambiguation), multiple people 
Greg Garcia (disambiguation), multiple people
Greg Gardner (born 1975), Canadian ice hockey player and coach
Greg Garrett (disambiguation), multiple people
Greg Garrison (1924–2005), American television producer and director
Greg Gary (disambiguation), multiple people
Greg Gibson (disambiguation), multiple people
Greg Green (born 1963), American businessman
Greg Guidry (1954–2003), American singer-songwriter
Greg Hall (disambiguation), multiple people
Greg Ham (1953–2012), Australian musician, songwriter, member of the band Men at Work
Greg Harris (disambiguation), multiple people
Greg Hartle (born 1951), American football player
Greg Hill (disambiguation), multiple people
Greg Holland (disambiguation), multiple people
Greg Holmes (disambiguation), multiple people
Greg Howard (disambiguation), multiple people
Greg Jackson (disambiguation), multiple people
Greg James (disambiguation), multiple people
Greg Jeffries (born 1971), American football player
Greg Johnson (disambiguation), multiple people
Greg Johnston (disambiguation), multiple people
Greg Jones (disambiguation), multiple people
Greg Joseph (born 1994) American football player
Greg Kane (disambiguation), multiple people
Greg Kennedy (disambiguation), multiple people
Greg Kindle (born 1950), American football player
Greg King (disambiguation), multiple people
Greg Lake (disambiguation), multiple people
Greg Lamberson (born 1964), American author and filmmaker
Greg Lambert (disambiguation), multiple people
Greg Lee (disambiguation), multiple people
Greg LeMond (born 1961), American road racing cyclist, three-time winner of the Tour de France
Greg Lewis (disambiguation), multiple people
Greg Little (disambiguation), multiple people
Greg Lloyd (born 1965), American player in the National Football League
Greg Lloyd Jr. (born 1989), American player in the National Football League, son of the above
Greg Long (disambiguation), multiple people
Greg Louganis (born 1960), American Olympic champion diver and LGBT activist
Greg Luzinski (born 1950), American baseball player
Greg Maddux (born 1966), American baseball player
Greg Malone (disambiguation), multiple people
Greg Mancz (born 1992), American football player
Greg Marshall (disambiguation), multiple people
Greg Martin (disambiguation), multiple people
Greg Miller (disambiguation), multiple people
Greg Moore (disambiguation), multiple people
Greg Morris (disambiguation), multiple people
Greg Mullavey (born 1939), American theater, television, and film actor
Greg Myers (disambiguation), multiple people
Greg Nelson (disambiguation), multiple people
Greg Newsome II (born 2000), American football player
Greg Norman (born 1955), Australian golfer and entrepreneur
Greg Norton (disambiguation), multiple people
Greg Olsen (disambiguation), multiple people
Greg Olson (disambiguation), multiple people
Greg Orton (disambiguation), multiple people
Greg Page (disambiguation), multiple people
Greg Parker, British physicist
Greg Pearce (disambiguation), multiple people
Greg Perry (disambiguation), multiple people
Greg Peterson (disambiguation), multiple people
Greg Potter, American comic book writer
Greg Richards (disambiguation), multiple people
Greg Roberts (disambiguation), multiple people
Greg Robinson (disambiguation), multiple people
Greg Rusedski (born 1973), Canadian-born British tennis player
Greg Rutherford (born 1986), British long jumper 
Greg Scott (disambiguation), multiple people
Greg Senat (born 1994), American football player
Greg Shaw (disambiguation), multiple people
Greg Smith (disambiguation), multiple people
Greg Stekelman (born 1975), English novelist
Greg Stevens (disambiguation), multiple people
Greg Stewart (disambiguation), multiple people
Greg Stroman (born 1996), American football player
Greg Sutton (disambiguation), multiple people
Greg Tansey (born 1988), English footballer
Greg Taylor (disambiguation), multiple people
Greg Thompson (disambiguation), multiple people
Greg Tribbett (born 1968), American musician and songwriter
Greg van Hest (born 1973), Dutch long-distance runner
Greg Valentine (born 1951), American professional wrestler
Greg Vavra (born 1961), Canadian football player
Greg Walker (disambiguation), multiple people
Greg Ward Jr. (born 1995), American football player
Greg Warren (disambiguation), multiple people
Greg Wells (disambiguation), multiple people
Greg Whittington (born 1993), American basketball player
Greg Wilkins (disambiguation), multiple people
Greg Williams (disambiguation), multiple people
Greg Wilson (disambiguation), multiple people
Greg Wood (disambiguation), multiple people
Greg Young (disambiguation), multiple people
Greg Zuerlein, multiple people

People with the nickname
 Greg (cartoonist) (1931–1999), the pseudonym of Belgian comic book artist Michel Regnier
 GregTech, a Minecraft mod

Fictional characters with the name
 Greg, a character in the 2021 Canadian-American movie Mister Sister
 Greg Brady (Brady Bunch), on the American sitcom The Brady Bunch
 Greg Flemming, in the webcomic User Friendly
 Greg Foster (The Young and the Restless), on the American soap opera The Young and the Restless
 Greg Heffley, protagonist of the children's book series Diary of a Wimpy Kid
 Greg Jessop, on the British soap opera EastEnders
 Detective Inspector Greg Lestrade, in the TV series Sherlock
 Greg Montgomery, one of the lead characters of Dharma & Greg, an American sitcom, played by Thomas Gibson
 Greg Nelson, on the American soap opera All My Children
 The title character in Greg the Bunny, an American sitcom
 Greg, the secondary main character in Over the Garden Wall
 Greg Universe, the father of the main character in the Cartoon Network show Steven Universe

See also
 
 Gregg (disambiguation)
 Gregory (disambiguation)
 Gregoire (disambiguation)
 Gregores (disambiguation)
 Gregor (disambiguation)
 Greig (disambiguation)

Masculine given names
Hypocorisms
English-language masculine given names
English masculine given names